Emil Okuliár (born 22 May 1931) is a Czech cross-country skier. He competed in the men's relay event at the 1956 Winter Olympics.

References

External links
 

1931 births
Possibly living people
Czech male cross-country skiers
Olympic cross-country skiers of Czechoslovakia
Cross-country skiers at the 1956 Winter Olympics
Place of birth missing (living people)